Penstemon cobaea is a flowering plant in the plantain family, commonly known as cobaea beardtongue, prairie beardtongue or foxglove penstemon. The plant is native to the central United States, primarily the Great Plains from Nebraska to Texas, with additional populations in the Ozarks of Missouri and Arkansas. There are also populations reported in the southwestern United States as well as in Illinois and Ohio, but these appear to be introductions.

Habitat
Penstemon cobaea grows on hillsides, gravel, rocky outcrops, and gypsum soils, and eroded pastures.

Description

The flowers have a structure reminiscent of a ribcage inside, and can be white or pink with magenta lines.

Cultivation
The flowers of Penstemon cobaea will eventually become brown and black capsules, which contain the seeds. After planting, the seeds will take about two years to flower. It is good to leave  between plants when gardening, and lime is often needed in the soil.

References

External links
photo of herbarium specimen at Missouri Botanical Garden, collected in Missouri in 1989

cobaea
Flora of the United States
Plants described in 1836